Tomo Gluić (born 26 July 1983) is a Croatian retired football player, who last played for hometown club NK Zadar.

After retiring as a player, he was hired by the Chinese FA as a goalkeeper coach for their U-13 team.

References

External links
 

1983 births
Living people
Sportspeople from Zadar
Association football goalkeepers
Croatian footballers
NK GOŠK Dubrovnik players
NK Bjelovar players
NK Zadar players
Croatian Football League players
Croatian expatriate sportspeople in China